Icarus Verilog is an implementation of the Verilog hardware description language compiler that generates netlists in the desired format (EDIF). It supports the 1995, 2001 and 2005 versions of the standard, portions of SystemVerilog, and some extensions.

Released under the GNU General Public License, Icarus Verilog is free software.

As of release 0.9, Icarus is composed of a Verilog compiler (including a Verilog preprocessor) with support for plug-in backends, and a virtual machine that simulates the design. Release v10.0, besides general improvements and bug fixes, added preliminary support for VHDL, but the VHDL support has been abandoned as of 2018.

History 

Not even the author quite remembers when the project was first started, but CVS records go back to 1998. There have been releases 0.2 through the current stable release 10.0.

Icarus Verilog development is done largely by the sole regular author, Stephen Williams. Some non-trivial portions have been contributed as accepted patches.

See also 

Comparison of EDA software

External links
 Icarus Verilog official web site
 GitHub page
 Icarus Verilog documentation wiki
 Icarus Verilog installer for Microsoft Windows
 Online interface to Icarus Verilog
 Open Source in Electronic Design Automation
 Icarus Verilog: Open-Source Verilog More than a Year Later
 EDA Playground - run Icarus Verilog simulations from the web browser
 Historical CSV repository
 VHDL support abandoned

Free electronic design automation software
Electronic design automation software for Linux